Andreias Cristian Calcan (born 9 April 1994) is a Romanian professional footballer who plays as a winger for Liga I club FC Argeș Pitești. In his career he also played for other Romanian sides such as Universitatea Cluj, Viitorul Constanța or CSM Râmnicu Vâlcea and in the Netherlands for Willem II, FC Dordrecht and Almere City.

Club career

Early years / Universitatea Cluj
Calcan started playing football in his hometown as a youngster for CSS Slatina under the command of Ion Pârvulescu, the coach who previously discovered two other significant Romanian players: Ionel Dănciulescu and Claudiu Niculescu. When he was fourteen he moved to Ardealul Cluj of Cluj-Napoca and in 2010 he joined FC Universitatea Cluj together with twelve other teammates. On 23 August 2013, Calcan made his debut in Liga I, the Romanian top football league, in a 6–0 away loss against FC Dinamo București.

Willem II
On 22 July 2016, Calcan moved abroad for the first time to sign a two-year contract with Dutch side Willem II.

Honours

Club
Universitatea Cluj
Cupa României runner-up: 2014–15

Viitorul Constanța
Cupa României: 2018–19
Supercupa României: 2019

References

External links

1994 births
Living people
Sportspeople from Slatina, Romania
Romanian footballers
Romania under-21 international footballers
Association football midfielders
Liga I players
Liga II players
Nemzeti Bajnokság I players
FC Universitatea Cluj players
SCM Râmnicu Vâlcea players
FC Viitorul Constanța players
Eredivisie players
Eerste Divisie players
Willem II (football club) players
FC Dordrecht players
Almere City FC players
Újpest FC players
Mezőkövesdi SE footballers
FC Argeș Pitești players
Romanian expatriate footballers
Expatriate footballers in the Netherlands
Expatriate footballers in Hungary
Romanian expatriate sportspeople in the Netherlands
Romanian expatriate sportspeople in Hungary